Dymer is an urban-type settlement in Vyshhorod Raion of Kyiv Oblast (province) of Ukraine with a population of  It hosts the administration of Dymer settlement hromada, one of the hromadas of Ukraine.

Clashes occurred here during the 2022 Russian invasion of Ukraine. Ukrainian airborne assault troops engaged Russian soldiers at Ivankiv and Dymer as part of the Battle of Ivankiv.

References

Urban-type settlements in Vyshhorod Raion
Vyshhorod Raion
Populated places established in 1582
Crown land
Kiev Governorate
1582 in the Polish–Lithuanian Commonwealth
1582 establishments in Europe
1582 in Ukraine